Amaya Gastaminza Ganuza (born 27 February 1991) is a Spanish professional basketball player. She plays for Hondarribia-Irún and Spain women's national basketball team. She has represented several junior teams in European competitions. She won EuroLeague Women 2010–11 with Perfumerías Avenida Baloncesto.

References

External links 
 Amaya Gastaminza at FIBA Europe
 
 
 

1991 births
Living people
Spanish women's basketball players
Spanish women's 3x3 basketball players
Sportspeople from Pamplona
Small forwards